List of rulers of Halychyna and its sister principality Volhynia. They were basically separate principalities (rulers being closely related) until Roman the Great, Prince of Volhynia who conquered also Halych but immediately gave it to his son. They continued usually as separate states, but within the same dynasty and under vassalage to Knyaz of Halych until Lev, who annexed Volhynia to the principality. The royal crown lapsed and rulers were known as princes and/or dukes after Andriy Yuriyovych.

Volhynia

Rulers of Independent Volhynia
 Boris Vladimirovich
 Vsevolod I 987–? - brother of Boris
 Sviatoslav I 1036–1054 - also ruler of Kievan Rus'
 Igor Yaroslavich, 1054–1056
 Rostislav I 1056–1064 - also ruler of Tmutarakan.
 Oleg I 1075–1076 - also ruler of Chernigov.
 Yaropolk I Iziaslavich 1078–1087 
 David Igorevich 1087–1099
 Mstislav I Sviatopolkovich 1099
 Yaroslav 1100–1118 - brother of Mstislav I.
 Roman I Vladimirovich 1118–1119 
 Andrew I 1119–1135 - brother of Roman I.
 Iziaslav I Mstislavich 1135–1141
 Sviatoslav II 1141–1146 - also ruler of Kiev.
 Vladimir I Andriyovich 1146–1149
 Sviatopolk Mstislavich 1149
 Iziaslav II 1149–1151 - brother of Sviatopolk.
 Sviatopolk Mstislavich (again) 1151–1154 
 Vladimir II Mstislavich 1154–1157
 Mstislav II 1157–1170 - also ruler of Kiev.
 Sviatoslav III Mstislavich 1170–1173
 Roman II the Great 1173–1188
 Vsevolod II Mstislavich 1188
 Roman II the Great (again) 1188–1199 - also ruler of Kiev

The Principality in the Kingdom of Halych-Volhynia
Between 1199 and 1205: annexed by the Kingdom of Halych–Volhynia
 Sviatoslav IV Igorevych 1206–1207
 Alexander Vsevolodovich 1208, 1209–1215
Between 1215 and 1238: annexed by the Kingdom of Galicia-Volhynia
 Vasylko Romanovych 1238–1269 
 Volodymyr Vasylkovych 1269–1288
 Mstyslav Danylovych 1288–1292
In 1293, Lev I centered all the power of the kingdom in his own hands, and the principality ceased to exist.

Halych

Rulers of Independent Principality of Halych 
 Volodar Rostyslavych of Tmutarakan ?–1084 
 Vasilko Romanovich 1084–? 
 Yuriy Vasilkovich ? 
 Igor-Ivan Rostislavich ?–1141 
 Vladimir I Volodarovich 1141–1153 
 Yaroslav Osmomysl 1153–1187 
 Oleg Yaroslavich 1187 
 Vladimir II Yaroslavych 1187–1189
 Oleg Yaroslavich (restored) 1188 
 Roman the Great 1188
 Andrew I 1188–1190
 Vladimir II Yaroslavych (restored) 1190–1199

The Principality in the Kingdom of Halych–Volhynia
Between 1199 and 1206: annexed by the Kingdom of Halych–Volhynia
 Vladimir III Igorevich 1206–1208 
 Roman II Igorevich 1208–1210 
 Vladimir III Igorevich (again) 1211

Between 1211 and 1213: annexed by the Kingdom of Halych–Volhynia
 Vladislav 1213 
 Coloman of Halych–Volhynia and Salomea of Poland 1213-1219
 Andrew II 1220–1221
 Mstislav the Bold 1219–1228

Between 1228 and 1264: annexed by the Kingdom of Halych–Volhynia
 Svarn 1264–1269
In 1293, Lev I centered all the power of the kingdom in his own hands, and the principality ceased to exist.

Halychyna and Volynia (Halych–Volhynia)

Rurik Dynasty

Piast Dynasty

House of Anjou

In 1399, Galicia-Volhynia merged in the Kingdom of Poland.

See also
 Grand Prince of Kiev
 Grand Prince of Vladimir
 List of leaders of Ukraine

References

External links
 Historical notes about political history of principality of Galicia - Volhynia
 mykolaiv.lviv.ua - Королівство Русі: реальність і міфи 

Rulers
Medieval Ukraine
 
 
Rulers of Galicia and Volhynia
Rulers of Galicia and Volhynia
Rulers of Galicia and Volhynia
Lists of European rulers
Medieval rulers
Middle Ages-related lists